Gypsophila litwinowii is a species of flowering plant in the family Caryophyllaceae, native to central European Russia, northwest of Voronezh. It is confined to chalk outcrops.

References

litwinowii
Endemic flora of Russia
Flora of Central European Russia
Plants described in 1922